The Apotheosis of Athanasios Diakos (Greek: Αποθέωση του Αθανασίου Διάκου) is an oil painting by Konstantinos Parthenis created in 1933.

Description 
The oil painting has dimensions 380 x 380 centimeters. It is exhibited at the National Gallery of Greece.

Theme 
Athanasios Diakos was a freedom fighter for Greek independence, who was executed by the Ottoman Empire by impalement following the Battle of Alamana.

Analysis 

The painting shows a secular subject in a religious composition, with a cubist style.

See also 
 National Gallery (Athens)

References

Sources 

Paintings about the Greek War of Independence
1933 paintings